The 2012 All-Ireland Senior Ladies' Football Championship is the 39th edition of the Ladies' Gaelic Football Association's premier inter-county Ladies' Gaelic football tournament. It is known for sponsorship reasons as the TG4 All-Ireland Senior Ladies' Football Championship.

Structure
Thirteen teams compete.
The top four teams from 2011 receive byes to the quarter-finals.
The quarter-finalists from 2011 receive byes to the second round.
The other two teams play in the first round.
All games are knockout matches, drawn games being replayed.

Fixtures and results

Qualifiers

Final stages

References

!